Martius may refer to:
 Martius (month) the month of March on the ancient Roman calendar
 Campus Martius, the "Field of Mars" in ancient Rome
 Telo Martius, an ancient name for Toulon, France

People
 Carl Friedrich Philipp von Martius (1794–1868), German botanist
 Hedwig Conrad-Martius (1888–1966), German phenomenologist
 Carl Alexander von Martius (1838–1920), German chemist, company founder and entrepreneur

Other uses
 Dryocopus martius, the black woodpecker
 Martius yellow, a chemical compound and dye
 Trachycarpus martianus, also known as Martius' fan palm
 Hofmann-Martius rearrangement, in chemistry

See also
 Marcius (disambiguation)
 Mars (disambiguation)
 Campus Martius (disambiguation)